Dominique Ohaco (born 19 December 1995 in Santiago, Chile) is a Chilean skier. She competed for Chile at the 2014 Winter Olympics in the premier of Women's slopestyle. She was selected to be Chile's flag bearer at the 2014 Winter Olympics. 

She has represented Chile at 3 winter Olympics in 2014, 2018, and 2022.

References 

1995 births
Living people
Chilean female freestyle skiers
Olympic freestyle skiers of Chile
Freestyle skiers at the 2014 Winter Olympics
Freestyle skiers at the 2018 Winter Olympics
Freestyle skiers at the 2022 Winter Olympics
Sportspeople from Santiago
21st-century Chilean women